Smith Island is a collection of three distinct island communities, Tylerton, Rhodes Point, and Ewell, Maryland on the Chesapeake Bay, on the border of Maryland and Virginia territorial waters in the United States. The island is the last inhabited island in Maryland that is not accessible by vehicle, where most of the islands are eroding due to tidal currents and sea level rise. Smith Island is expected to completely erode by 2100.

The island's population is approximately 220, down from a peak of about 800.  On its Maryland side, Smith Island is a census-designated place (CDP) in Somerset County. It is included in the Salisbury, Maryland-Delaware Metropolitan Statistical Area.

Geography
The island consists of three communities, namely Ewell, Tylerton and Rhodes Point, which all sit on the Maryland portion of the island. The Virginia portion is uninhabited, although it once contained many homes of early settlers.

Although a portion of this island lies within Virginia, "Smith Island, Virginia" refers to a separate but identically named barrier island off Cape Charles.

Climate change and sea level rise 
By the 2010s, the island had shrunk mainly due to erosion and rising sea levels. The island is projected to be completely eroded by 2100 should the sea level rise by another foot. Preventative measures including a jetty-building project completed in 2018, and the realignment of waterways through dredging, were implemented in the hope to stop this. Moreover, the island is building additional coastal defenses.

Demographics

The community is located in a small town-area in the central part of the island, spread across the three inhabited locations of Ewell, Rhodes Point and Tylerton, all located in the state of Maryland. The northern part of Smith Island also includes the Martin National Wildlife Refuge. The southernmost portion of the island consisting of marsh lies in Accomack County, Virginia.

As of the 2010 Census, there were 276 people residing in the CDP. The racial makeup of the CDP was 99.6% White, 0.82% African American, 0.27% Native American, and 0.82% from two or more races. 51% of Smith Island's residents were English, 4% Greek, 3% Irish, 3% Scottish, and 3% French.

There were 167 households, out of which 19.2% had children under the age of 18 living with them, 60.5% were married couples living together, 4.2% had a female householder with no husband present, and 32.9% were non-families. 29.3% of all households were made up of individuals, and 16.8% had someone living alone who was 65 years of age or older. The average household size was 2.18 and the average family size was 2.69.

In the CDP, the population was spread out, with 14.6% under the age of 18, 5.5% from 18 to 24, 22.3% from 25 to 44, 34.6% from 45 to 64, and 23.1% who were 65 years of age or older. The median age was 50 years. For every 100 females, there were 95.7 males. For every 100 females age 18 and over, there were 96.8 males.

The median income for a household in the CDP was $26,324, and the median income for a family was $29,375. Males had a median income of $26,250 versus $28,750 for females. The per capita income for the CDP was $25,469. About 14.4% of families and 37.8% of the population were below the poverty line, including 26.9% of those under age 18 and 67.9% of those age 65 or over.

Transportation
Smith Island has no airport and no bridges to the mainland; it can be accessed only by boat. Passenger-only ferries connect Smith Island at Ewell to Point Lookout, Maryland, and Reedville, Virginia, on the Western shore of the Chesapeake Bay (seasonal) and from Crisfield, Maryland, on its Eastern Shore (year-round).  A daily passenger ferry also runs between Crisfield, Maryland, and the smaller island of Tylerton, Maryland.

Few motor vehicles exist on the islands, those of which are all on the northern community of Ewell and the connected Rhodes Point.  Main modes of transportation for all three communities include golf carts as well as non-motorized transportation.

History and language

The island was charted by John Smith. British settlers arrived on the island in the 17th century, arriving from Cornwall, Wales, and Dorset, England, via Virginia. The island's population peaked at 800 in the 1900s.

Smith Island is inhabited by one of the region's oldest English-speaking communities, which is known for its relic accent, preserving speech patterns from the original English colonial settlers. The local dialect is like the dialects of the West Country of England, including Cornwall. The dialect contains some relict features indicative of its origins. The dialect is like the Ocracoke Brogue, sometimes referred to as the Outer Banks Brogue.

The 1940 Maryland guide described a series of economic conflicts that characterized relationships between the inhabitants of Smith Island, the inhabitants of nearby Tangier Island, and agencies of the Federal government in the late 19th and early 20th centuries. For example, although 23,000 acres of rich oyster beds had been ceded from Maryland to Virginia in 1877,

The Island Belle, a former passenger ferry to the islands, was listed on the National Register of Historic Places in 1979.

After the 2012 Hurricane Sandy, the Department of Housing and Community Development for the state of Maryland offered buyouts to landowners, most of whom refused the offer.

Smith Island cake

Smith Island traditions include a region-specific cuisine, its most famous dish being the Smith Island cake, somewhat resembling the Prinzregententorte, with 8 to 15 thin layers alternating with cooked chocolate frosting.

Beginning in the 1800s, Smith Islanders would send these cakes with the watermen on the autumn oyster harvest. The bakers began using fudge instead of buttercream frostings, as cakes frosted with fudge lasted much longer than cakes with other types of frosting.

Scratch recipes typically involve evaporated milk, while recipes based on commercial cake mixes add condensed milk.

The most common recipes yield yellow cake with chocolate frosting, but other flavors variation include coconut, fig, strawberry, lemon, and orange.  Smith Island cake is baked for any occasion, a dessert that needs no holiday.

Smith Island cake is also baked as the feature prize for a local fundraising tradition called a cake walk, which is a game played like musical chairs where donated cakes serve as the prize.  Great attention is paid to the perfection of the pencil-thin layers that form the distinctive cake.  Before each round, the prize Smith Island cake at stake is cut in half and shown to the players who pay to participate in the game.  A poorly stacked Smith Island cake may not attract many players and as a result, not raise as much money as a more perfectly executed cake.

Smith Island cake became the officially designated state dessert of Maryland on April 24, 2008.

See also
 Island Belle (vessel)
 Fog Point Light
 Solomons Lump Light
 Tangier Island

References

External links

 Official website
 Getting to Smith Island
 Boston Globe Big Picture Photographs

 
Crabbing communities in Maryland
Fishing communities in Maryland
Census-designated places in Somerset County, Maryland
Car-free zones in the United States
Census-designated places in Maryland
Cornish-American history
English-American culture in Maryland
Maryland islands of the Chesapeake Bay
Salisbury metropolitan area
Welsh-American culture in Maryland
Maryland populated places on the Chesapeake Bay
Landforms of Somerset County, Maryland
Islands of Accomack County, Virginia
Virginia islands of the Chesapeake Bay
Maryland cuisine